Nils Haßfurther is a German professional basketball player who last played for s.Oliver Würzburg.

Early life
Nils Haßfurther was born in Bamberg.

Professional career
In the 2018–19 ProA season, Haßfurther was a key player for the vice Champion Nürnberg Falcons BC who earned the rights to promote to the Basketball Bundesliga. There, he averaged 7.5 points and 3.2 assists per game while shooting 46% from the three-point line.

In Oktober 2019, Haßfurther signed with s.Oliver Würzburg, under head coach Denis Wucherer, for two years. 
In Würzburg, Haßfurther has received personal training by Holger Geschwindner, the mentor of Dirk Nowitzki.

Player profile
Würzburg's coach Wucherer stated that he values Haßfurther's shooting ability.

German national team
Haßfurther has been a member of the German national under-16 team and the German national under-18 team.

References

External links
FIBA Profile 
Profile at REALGM.com
Profile at Eurobasket.com

1999 births
Living people
Point guards
German men's basketball players
Nürnberg Falcons BC players
Sportspeople from Bamberg
S.Oliver Würzburg players